Joel Blumenthal Wolowelsky (b. 1946) is a Modern Orthodox thinker and author. He is the dean of faculty at the Yeshivah of Flatbush high school, where he teaches Ethics and mathematics. He has written extensively on topics pertaining to the role of women in Judaism and Jewish medical ethics. He served as Associate Editor of Tradition, the Journal of Jewish Thought, and The Young One, published by the Rabbinical Council of America, the Tora u-Madda Journal published by Yeshiva University, and MeOtzer HoRav: Selected Writings of Rabbi Joseph B. Soloveitchik.

Education and career
Wolowelsky earned his Bachelor of Science degree at Yeshiva University in 1969 and his doctorate in philosophy at New York University Steinhardt School of Culture, Education and Human Development in 1979. 

He served as chairman of advanced placement studies at Yeshivah of Flatbush.

Wolowelsky is on the advisory boards of the Lookstein Center for Jewish Education at Bar-Ilan University, the Boston Initiative for Excellence in Jewish Day Schools, and the Pardes Educators Program in Jerusalem.

Awards
Yeshiva University Lifetime Achievement Award in Jewish Education (2010)

Selected bibliography

Books
 (ed. with Emanuel Feldman)

 (ed.)
 (ed. with Lawrence H. Schiffman)
 (ed. with David Shatz)

 
 (ed. with Emanuel Feldman)
 
 (ed. with Emanuel Feldman)

MeOtzer HoRav series
 (ed. with David Shatz and Reuven Ziegler)
 (ed. with Eli D. Clark and Reuven Ziegler)
 (ed. with Reuven Ziegler)
 (ed. with David Shatz and Reuven Ziegler)
 (ed. with David Shatz)

References

American Modern Orthodox Jews
1946 births
Living people